Joyce Vuyiswa Basson is a South African politician. She was elected to the National Assembly of South Africa in 2014 as a member of the African National Congress. In parliament, she served on the Portfolio Committee on Basic Education.

Basson left parliament at the 2019 general election.

References

Living people
Year of birth missing (living people)
Coloured South African people
People from the Northern Cape
African National Congress politicians
21st-century South African politicians
Members of the National Assembly of South Africa
Women members of the National Assembly of South Africa